The Challenge de France was a golf tournament on the Challenge Tour, played in France. It was held for the first time in May 1998 at Golf de Sablé-Solesmes in Sablé-sur-Sarthe, before moving to October for the following three seasons, during which it was played on a succession of French courses. The tournament was discontinued after 2001, although the name was used on some occasions for the AGF-Allianz Open des Volcans. In 2011, the tournament was revived as the Allianz Challenge de France, and was held at the Golf Disneyland course in Paris, which had also been the venue in 1999, and hosted the Tournoi Perrier de Paris in 1993. The 2011 edition was won by Germany's Nicolas Meitinger, securing his first Challenge Tour victory.

Winners

References

External links
Coverage on the Challenge Tour's official site

Former Challenge Tour events
Defunct golf tournaments in France